Shimki (Shemkhe) is a rural locality (a selo) in Tunkinsky District, Republic of Buryatia, Russia. The population was 512 as of 2010. There are 10 streets.

Geography 
Shimki is located 9 km west of Kyren (the district's administrative centre) by road. Khuzhiry is the nearest rural locality.

References 

Rural localities in Tunkinsky District